Bajo Caracoles  is a village and municipality in Santa Cruz Province in southern Argentina.  It lies on Ruta 40 some 127 km south of the town of Perito Moreno, and 3 km south of the junction with the access road to Cueva de las Manos.

The population of the village in the 2001 census was 31.

References

Populated places in Santa Cruz Province, Argentina